Black Lotus is the 2nd album from Taiwanese rock band Guntzepaula.  It was released on June 1, 2016 in Taiwan.

Track list

Discography

References

2016 albums
Guntzepaula albums